Kepa may refer to:

Kepa Arrizabalaga (born 1994), Spanish footballer
Kepa Blanco (born 1984), Spanish footballer
Kepa Junkera (born 1965), Spanish musician
Kępa (disambiguation), Polish placename
Kippah, Jewish skullcap
Kepa Bush Reserve, a reserve in New Zealand.

See also
 
KEPA